Nature China is an online publication by Nature Publishing Group (NPG) that highlights the best research being produced in Hong Kong and Mainland China in science and medicine. The international website was launched in January 2007. The Chinese website was launched on 25 April 2007. The site and its content is free-to-view for registered users.

Background 
China's scientific research is growing faster than that of any other country. China has the world's second highest number of researchers, at 923,000, behind the United States. By the end of 2006, China will also become the world's second highest investor in research and development (R&D), again behind the United States, with a forecast expenditure of over US$136 billion (at Purchasing Power Parity) 
.

According to the Institute for Scientific Information (ISI), the output of research papers from China has soared from 10,000 papers per year in 1990 to over 80,000 papers per year in 2006. To put this in context, it is now at the same level as the United Kingdom and Japan. More importantly, the number of very high impact papers (top 1 percentile of ISI citations) has increased  from 21 in 1994 to 223 in 2003 - a tenfold jump 
.

Aims and scope 
The aim of Nature China is to give scientists and professionals worldwide an insight into the latest research from Hong Kong and Mainland China.

Each week, the editors of Nature China survey all scientific journals (both English and Chinese journals) to identify the best, recently published papers from Hong Kong and Mainland China. Unlike most NPG journals, Nature China only publishes Research Highlights (short 200-word summaries) that explain the importance of the latest scientific findings in Hong Kong and Mainland China.

The website also features a Recommended Paper section where users can recommend any Chinese research paper of interest, whether it is novel or controversial, provided it is not their own. Users can also vote or comment on those suggestions already in the database.

The publication covers topics including:
 Biotechnology
 Cell & molecular Biology
 Chemistry
 Clinical medicine
 Developmental biology
 Earth & environment
 Ecology & evolution
 Genetics
 Materials
 Neuroscience
 Physics
 Space & astronomy

ISSN

See also
 Scientific publishing in China
 Nature 
 Nature Chemical Biology
 Nature Nanotechnology
 Nature Materials
 Nature Photonics 
 Nature Physics

References

External links
 Nature China international website
 Nature China mirror site (in China)

Online magazines published in the United Kingdom
Magazines established in 2007
Science and technology in China
Science and technology magazines published in the United Kingdom
Weekly magazines published in the United Kingdom